Chhanni is a town in the Islamabad Capital Territory of Pakistan. It is located at 33° 23' 45"N 73° 19' 0"E at an altitude of 492 metres (1617 feet).

References 

Union councils of Islamabad Capital Territory